William H. Steele (May 15, 1872 – April 14, 1955) was an American farmer and politician.

Born in the town of Brookfield, Waukesha County, Wisconsin, Steele went to schools in Pewaukee, Wisconsin and the University of Wisconsin. He taught school for twelve years. In 1911, he bought a dairy farm near Pewaukee and had apple orchards on his farm. Steele served on the Waukesha County Board of Supervisors and was chairman of the county board. Steele also served on the Pewaukee Town Board and was chairman of the Pewaukee Town Board. He also served as president of the village of Pewaukee before he moved to his dairy farm. Steele also served on the Pewaukee School Board and was president of the school board. In 1931 and 1933, Steele served in the Wisconsin State Assembly and was a Republican. Steele died in a hospital in Milwaukee, Wisconsin after a long illness.

Notes

1872 births
1955 deaths
People from Brookfield, Wisconsin
University of Wisconsin–Madison alumni
Educators from Wisconsin
Farmers from Wisconsin
County supervisors in Wisconsin
Wisconsin city council members
Mayors of places in Wisconsin
School board members in Wisconsin
Republican Party members of the Wisconsin State Assembly